Geevarghese Panicker (1924-2008) was a priest, teacher, guide and educationalist of Syro-Malankara Catholic Church.

Early life 

Panicker was born on 1 April 1924 at Karichal, Alappuzha as the eldest son to K. G. Thomas Panicker (Kezhakeveetil) and Achiyamma Thomas Panicker (Kaithayil-Kallupara), also he was the eldest of seven children.

He is the grand Nephew of the Archbishop Geevarghese Mar Ivanios, the founder of Syro-Malankara Catholic Church and who is also known as the 'Newman of India'.

Education 

Panicker had his primary education at Vazhathattu Primary School, Karichal, Alappuzha and middle school at St. James English Middle School, Karuvatta, Alappuzha. He completed his High school final under the guidance of Kainikkara Kumara Pillai at N.S.S. English High School, Karuvatta, Alappuzha.

After school education, he joined St. Aloysius Seminary, Trivandrum on his own volition under the guidance of Archbishop Geevarghese Mar Ivanios in 1940.

Panicker was not a common place individual. He received his B.A. honours in English Language and Literature from University of Travancore, Trivandrum. His academic qualifications include the master's degree in both Philosophy and Theology from the Papal Seminary, Kandy, Ceylon where he underwent training for priesthood.

He was ordained a priest on 24 August 1949 by Archbishop Geevarghese Mar Ivanios at Papal Seminary, Kandy, Ceylon.

He received his Doctorate in English Literature at Catholic University of America, Washington, D.C., United States in 1958.

Educationalist 

Panicker possessed great wisdom and extraordinary vision. He was an educator par excellence. He started his teaching career as a lecturer at Mar Ivanios College, Trivandrum.

Thousands of young men and women who had their undergraduate, graduate or post graduate education in the Mar Ivanios College at Trivandrum during his 20 years as Vice Principal and Principal (1961-to 1979) of that reputed institution, nurture in their hearts, deep and sincere appreciation, respect and affection for him.
Many of his students are prominent people in the society to name a few late minister of education- Mr. T.M. Jacob, political leaders like K. Muraleedharan, Cine Artist Mr.Jagathi Sreekumar, Mr.Jagadish, former Kerala State Principal Secretary Mr Jaya Kumar IAS, Mr. Alexander Jacob IPS etc.

It was noted as the 'Golden years of Mar Ivanios College' by the Late Education Minister of Kerala, C. H. Mohammed Koya.
Fr.Panicker also held many positions in the Senate and Syndicate of the University of Kerala. He also headed the Principals of Catholic College council at the University of Kerala.

Seminary rector 

After his retirement from the college, Panicker was appointed by the Bishops’ Council of Kerala as Rector and President of St. Joseph's Pontifical Seminary, Mangalapuzha, Aluva, which before its bifurcation had a student strength of more than 700 clerics, like St Patrick's College, Maynooth, Ireland decades ago.

Panicker’s tenure as Rector was for two consecutive terms of three years each (1979-1985). Thus, thousands of priests of the Roman Catholic, Syro-Malabar and Syro-Malankara Churches of Kerala have had the benefit of the guidance of this man of God.
Many of his students and co-priests have been ordained Bishops.

Then he went on to become the Rector of the newly established St. Mary’s Malankara Major Seminary, Trivandrum, of the Malankara Catholic Church, dedicated to the Blessed Virgin Mary. He played a major role in its establishment and progress.

Final years 

His final field of activity for 18 years from 1987 to 2005 was at SEERI (St. Ephrem Ecumenical Research Institute), Kottayam where he served as Dean of Studies. Panicker’s scholarship and expertise in various fields was put to good use in the many offices he held.

Author 

Panicker wrote a number of articles on theology and liturgy.

His main works are:
An Historical Introduction to the Syriac Liturgy (1989)
 The Church in the Syriac Tradition (1990).

Death 

Panicker left for his heavenly abode on 28 December 2008 at Assisi Atonement Hospital, Perzhumpuzha, Kollam.

His body was interred in St. George Syro-Malankara Catholic Church at Paranthal, Adoor. Major Archbishop of Syro-Malankara Catholic Church, Moran Mor Baselios Cardinal Cleemis Catholicos led the funeral service at Paranthal and he was buried near to his parents as per his request.

References

External links
 Mar Ivanios College
 Malankara Seminary

Syro-Malankara Catholics
Indian Christian theologians
1924 births
2008 deaths